is a railway station in the city of Yamagata, Yamagata Prefecture, Japan, operated by East Japan Railway Company (JR East).

Lines
Omoshiroyama-Kōgen Station is served by the Senzan Line, and is located 42.5 rail kilometers from the terminus of the line at Sendai Station.

Station layout
The station has one side platform, serving a single bi-directional track. The station is unstaffed.

History
The station was absorbed into the JR East network upon the privatization of JNR on April 1, 1987. It was renamed to its present name on March 13, 1988.

Surrounding area
Omoshiroyama-Kōgen skiing area is nearby.  A ski lift carries passengers between the station and the ski slope.  In the summer, the station is accessible by automobile, but in the winter season the roads are usually closed.

See also
List of railway stations in Japan

External links

 JR East Station information 

Railway stations in Yamagata Prefecture
Senzan Line
Railway stations in Japan opened in 1987
Stations of East Japan Railway Company
Yamagata, Yamagata